Oliver Henry (born 29 July 2002) is an Australian rules footballer who plays for the Geelong Football Club in the Australian Football League (AFL), having initially been recruited by  with the 17th draft pick in the 2020 AFL draft.

Early football
Henry played for the St Mary's Sporting Club growing up. In his 2016 season with the club in the Under 14 division, he played 14 games and kicked 15 goals. He attended school at St Joseph's College, Geelong. He played for the Geelong Falcons in the NAB League, where he participated in 15 matches, kicking 18 goals. His best games saw him kick 5 goals in a single match against the Dandenong Stingrays, and four against the Sydney Swans Academy team. He was selected in the Vic Country representative squad, but did not play a game.

AFL career
On debut, Henry collected 4 disposals and a mark.

Statistics
Updated to the end of the 2022 season.

|-
| 2021 ||  || 35
| 10 || 7 || 8 || 61 || 30 || 91 || 44 || 9 || 0.7 || 0.8 || 6.1 || 3.0 || 9.1 || 4.4 || 0.9 || 0
|-
| 2022 ||  || 16
| 15 || 21 || 15 || 88 || 33 || 121 || 44 || 13 || 1.4 || 1.0 || 5.9 || 2.2 || 8.1 || 2.9 || 0.9 || 1
|- class=sortbottom
! colspan=3 | Career
! 25 !! 28 !! 23 !! 149 !! 63 !! 212 !! 88 !! 22 !! 1.1 !! 0.9 !! 6.0 !! 2.5 !! 8.5 !! 3.5 !! 0.9 !! 1
|}

References

External links

2002 births
Living people
Collingwood Football Club players
Geelong Falcons players
Australian rules footballers from Victoria (Australia)